The 1964–65 Coppa Italia was the 18th edition of the Coppa Italia, a domestic football cup organised by the Italian Football Federation. It was won by Juventus, who defeated Internazionale 1–0 in the final.

First round

Intermediate round 

* Napoli qualified after drawing of lots.

Second round

Third round

Quarter-finals 
Torino, Bologna, Internazionale and Roma joined the competition in this round.

Semi-finals

Final

Top goalscorers

References
rsssf.com

Coppa Italia seasons
Coppa Italia, 1964–65
1964–65 domestic association football cups